The Mercer Bears men's soccer team represents Mercer University in all NCAA Division I men's college soccer competitions. The Bears play in the Southern Conference.

Coaching staff 
As of March 17, 2019.

Championships

Conference regular season championships 
Mercer has won six regular season championships.

Conference tournament championships 
Mercer has won five conference tournaments. Two Atlantic Sun Men's Soccer Tournaments and three Southern Conference Men's Soccer Tournaments.

Postseason

NCAA tournament results 
Mercer has appeared in four NCAA Tournaments. Their combined record is 0–4–0.

Notes

References

External links 
 

 
Association football clubs established in 1970
1970 establishments in Georgia (U.S. state)